The 2001 Portuguese motorcycle Grand Prix was the eleventh round of the 2001 Grand Prix motorcycle racing season. It took place on the weekend of 7–9 September 2001 at the Autódromo do Estoril.

500 cc classification

250 cc classification

125 cc classification

Championship standings after the race (500cc)

Below are the standings for the top five riders and constructors after round eleven has concluded.

Riders' Championship standings

Constructors' Championship standings

 Note: Only the top five positions are included for both sets of standings.

References

Portuguese motorcycle Grand Prix
Portuguese
Motorcycle Grand Prix
September 2001 sports events in Europe